James Sample (5 November 1921 – 7 January 1992) was an English professional footballer who played as an inside forward.

Career
Born in Morpeth, Sample moved from Ashington to Bradford City in August 1947, scoring 2 goals in 8 league appearances for the club, before being released in 1948.

Sources

References

1921 births
1992 deaths
English footballers
Ashington A.F.C. players
Bradford City A.F.C. players
English Football League players
Association football inside forwards